Augustfehn is a railway station located in Augustfehn, Germany. The station is located on the Oldenburg–Leer railway. The train services are operated by Deutsche Bahn.

Train services
The following services currently call at the station:

Intercity services (IC 56) Norddeich - Emden - Leer - Bremen - Hannover - Braunschweig - Magdeburg - Leipzig / Berlin - Cottbus
Regional services  Norddeich - Emden - Oldenburg - Bremen - Nienburg - Hanover

References

Railway stations in Lower Saxony